The 1995 Chilean telethon was the 13th version of the solidarity campaign held in Chile since 1978. The theme of this version was "Our great work." The event took place on 1–2 December 1995. The chosen poster boy for the campaign was Marcel Cáceres.

The event, broadcast over twenty seven consecutive hours, was conducted primarily at the Teatro Teleton and the closing of the programme was broadcast from the National Stadium, the first time that the closing of the program was held there. During the early hours of Sunday, 3 December the final count was given, a total of CL$ 5,005,253,668. Although that figure far exceeded the amount collected from the last telethon (CL$ 3,138,513,916), the goal was to double that amount, so it was the first and, so far, the only telethon that has failed the objective.

Development
As usual, the Telethon was opened in the presence of various authorities with an emotional keynote address by Don Francisco, where he announced that the goal for this year would be double the amount raised in the previous edition, making the goal CL$ 6,277,027,832. In the first count, held at 23.15, the enthusiasm was high as the figure given by the Bank of Chile reached $ 32,357,523, more than double the proceeds from the 1994 Telethon at the same time. But as the next few hours passed, the donations began to wane, and at 00.17, the second count nearly equalled the figure of last year's event, and by 10am it had not even surpassed 700 million pesos. During that time, a group of government politicians and members of the government opposition did a comic piece called "Policoro."

The figures throughout the day were not encouraging, at 17.42, a new total showed only CL$ 1,879,164,121. 

When the final leg of the presentation started at the Teatro Teleton (about 19.00), Don Francisco asked TV channels for a one-hour delay in transmission of their newscasts to urge Chileans to go to the bank. The channels accepted the proposal and, at 22.00, Francisco gave the new total CL$ 3,208,291,257. 

The likelihood that the goal would not be reached became more and more apparent, two hours before the end of the event and the total had only just passed the previous events, half of the goal. In an interview on Channel 13 newscast, Teletrece, Don Francisco, before going to the National Stadium, stating that nothing had worked as planned, and asking people to go back to the bank if possible, and that he did not think the goal would be met, although he hoped at least to get close to it.

For the first time the closing event was at the National Stadium, which was filled to capacity. At 23.26, a new total was given, CL$ 3,908,243,017. Don Francisco finally admitted that the goal will not be reached, which was confirmed when at 00.33, the numbers barely exceeded $ 4,200 million. 

The transmission extended for an hour and at 2.06 the final count was CL$ 5,005,253,668, nearly 1,200 million pesos less than expected. Prior to closing, Don Francisco thanked all those involved and expressed his respect for those who did not. Days later, the Bank of Chile gave the final count of $ 5,534,774,829, which would become the goal for the next edition.

Totals

Sponsors

Artists

National singers
  Juan Antonio Labra
  Alberto Plaza
  Cecilia Echeñique
  Irene Llano
  Patricia Frias
  Lorena
  Los Jaivas
  Buddy Richard
  La Sociedad
  La Sonora de Tommy Rey
  Los Ramblers
  Los Peores de Chile
  Rodolfo Navech
  Ginette Acevedo
  Cristobal
  Nelly Sanders
  Keko Yungue
  René Inostroza
   Paolo Salvatore
  Rumba 8
  Aleste
  Álvaro Scaramelli
  Beatlemania
  Germán Casas
  Sonora Palacios
  Banda San Andrés
  El Monteaguilino
  La nueva ola
  Javiera Parra
   Andrea Tessa
  Illapu
  Myriam Hernández
  Jano Soto

International singers
  Garibaldi
  Luz Casal
  Daniela Mercury
  Aterciopelados
  Barrio Boyzz
  Banana 5
  Facundo Monti
  Azul Violeta
  Los Calzones Rotos
   Proyecto Uno
  El General

Comedians
 Coco Legrand
 Jorge "Chino" Navarrete
 Oscar Gangas
 Paulo Iglesias
 Ricardo Meruane
 Thompson - Bruce
 Los Indolatinos
 Lalo Vilches
 Álvaro Salas

Magazine
 Johnny Weich, ventriloquist
 Ballet Mosseiev
 Generación 95
 Raul Di Blasio

Children's Section
 Disney Club
 Pipiripao
 Cachureos
 Los Tachuelas
 La Chilindrina

Transmission
 Telenorte
 Canal 2 Rock & Pop
 La Red
 UCV Televisión
 Televisión Nacional de Chile
 Megavisión
 Chilevisión Red de Televisión Universidad de Chile
 Universidad Católica de Chile Televisión
 Red Metrópolis-TV Cable Intercom
 Red VTR TV Cable-Cablexpress

References

External links

Telethon
Chilean telethons